Rajendra Desai is current Mayor of Bhavnagar and a senior Bhartiya Janata Party polition.

See also
 Bharatiya Janata Party

References

Living people
Mayors of places in Gujarat
People from Bhavnagar
Bharatiya Janata Party politicians from Gujarat
Year of birth missing (living people)